Bridlington Trinity Football Club was an English association football club based in Bridlington, in the East Riding of Yorkshire.

History
 1960–72 – Yorkshire League
 1972–82 – Midland Football League
 1982–90 – Northern Counties East League

Honours
Yorkshire League
Champions: 1963–64, 1966–67, 1967–68
Runners-up: 1969–70
Yorkshire League Division Two
Champions: 1961–62
Midland League
Runners-up: 1979–80

Records
 Furthest FA Cup run – 3rd qualifying round, 1965–66, 1970–71, 1985–86
 Furthest FA Trophy run – 1st round, 1969–70, 1973–74
 Furthest FA Vase run – 1st round, 1989–90

References

Defunct football clubs in England
Yorkshire Football League
Midland Football League (1889)
Defunct football clubs in the East Riding of Yorkshire
Association football clubs disestablished in 1990